The Wyche Baronetcy, of Chewton in the County of Somerset, was a title in the Baronetage of Great Britain. It was created on 20 December 1729 for Cyril Wyche, subsequently Envoy Extraordinary and Minister Plenipotentiary to Russia. He was the son of John Wyche, Envoy Extraordinary at Hamburg, the grandson of Sir Peter Wyche, the great-grandson of Sir Peter Wyche and the grand-nephew of Sir Cyril Wyche. Wyche had no surviving sons and the title became extinct upon his death in 1756.

Wyche baronets, of Chewton (1729)
Sir Cyril Wyche, 1st Baronet (–1756)

References

Extinct baronetcies in the Baronetage of Great Britain